The Grand Prix Ball (GP Ball) at London's Hurlingham Club is an annual charity gala held prior to the British Grand Prix at Silverstone in support of The Prince's Trust

History
In 2010 it was hosted by Eddie Jordan and James Allen and has so far raised over £150,000 for the CLIC Sargent. The event features a showcase of F1 cars through the ages. Previous balls have been held at Stowe House and Royal Albert Hall. The 2012 event had London's only live F1 demonstration from Lotus F1 Team's Jérôme d'Ambrosio. The 2013 event featured a live F1 Demonstration of Jackie Stewart's Tyrrell Racing F1 car. The current event is organised by Jonny Dodge. 

In 2014, the Grand Prix Ball moved to the HAC near to the city of London. It featured as part of Race Week a day time event celebrating Formula 1 and bringing the excitement of the sport to the city. The 2014 Grand Prix Ball raised money for The Prince's Trust and offered a variety of packages to help raise funds for the charity.

In 2015, the Grand Prix Ball was held back at London's Hurlingham Club hosted by Eddie Jordan and Stirling Moss. The 2016 Grand Prix Ball was hosted in support of the Princes Trust and was hosted by Eddie Jordan the new Top Gear presenter and automotive journalist Tiff Needell.

Performances and hosts

2010: Sugababes, Seb Fontaine, and Darius

2011: Rebecca Ferguson

2012: Sophie Ellis-Bextor

2013: The Feeling, Seb Fontaine

2014: Spandau Ballet, Ben Ainslie

2015: Toploader, Seb Fontaine, Stirling Moss

2016: M People, Seb Fontaine, Tiff Needell, Eddie Jordan

2017: Gipsy Kings.

References

External links 
Official website

Charity events in the United Kingdom
Formula One